Pseudobiceros bedfordi (common names Persian carpet flatworm and Bedford's flatworm) is a species of flatworm in the family Pseudocerotidae.

This species has two penises, which it uses to engage in penis fencing, attempting to inject sperm into its opponent in order to fertilize it, while simultaneously avoiding being fertilized by their opponent.

Description
Pseudobiceros bedfordi is a large polyclad flatworm approximately 8–10 cm in length. It has a distinctive pattern consisting of a brown to black background, with multiple transverse, bilateral pink lines around thousands of tightly spaced, bright yellow spots, pink undulating spots with stripes on the sides of the body.

The edges of the body are usually ruffled. The underside of Pseudobiceros bedfordi is pale pink. The front of the body has a pair of erect pseudotentacles.

Distribution
This species is found in Indonesia, Malaysia, Kenya, Micronesia, Northern Mariana Islands, Thailand, Australia, Philippines, Solomon Islands, Myanmar, and Palau.

Habitat 
Pseudobiceros bedfordi is found on coral rubble and ledges in back reefs, coastal bays, and in lagoons.

Behaviour 
This worm is fast-moving, and is able to swim by undulating its body.

Diet 
Pseudobiceros bedfordi feeds on ascidians and on crustaceans that are small enough to swallow.

Reproduction 

Like all flatworms in the genus Pseudobiceros, they are hermaphroditic and have two penises. During mating, they fence with one another, using their penises, attempting to stab and inject sperm in their opponent, while avoiding being fertilized by their opponent. They are able to inseminate their opponent by injecting their sperm into any region of the other's body they are able to penetrate. After successfully injecting the other, the spermatozoa stream through their partner's body on their way to ovaries, where they will fertilize the eggs. The stream is visible through the body tissue of the worm, appearing as pale streaks, like lightning jags.

References

External links
 

Turbellaria
Animals described in 1903